Danny Gerard (born Daniel Gerard Lanzetta; May 29, 1977) is an American actor and musician. He is best known for his role as Alan Silver in the CBS television series Brooklyn Bridge. He also starred in the short lived CBS series Blue Skies and the unaired NBC pilot News at Twelve.

Early life
Gerard was born in Mount Vernon, New York and is of Italian descent.

Career 
He was in the original Broadway production of Lost in Yonkers starring alongside Kevin Spacey, Mercedes Ruehl and Irene Worth.  He played the role of Arty, in this Tony award-winning production.  In 1997, he starred as the voice of the titular character in the animated film adaption of Jack London's White Fang.

Gerard was in the original cast of the musical Falsettoland, playing the role of Jason. He can be heard on the second disc of the two-CD set of "March of the Falsettos" and Falsettoland. He released a CD, The Story of a Minute in America in 2005.

Going by his real name Danny Lanzetta, he has also written several books and is a spoken word artist.

Filmography

Film

Television

References

External links

1977 births
American male actors
Living people
21st-century American singers
21st-century American male singers